Roswell B. Rexford was a Michigan politician.

On November 8, 1854, Rexford was elected to the Michigan Senate where he represented the 11th district from January 3, 1855 to December 31, 1856. During his term in the legislature, he served on the Militia committee and the State Prison committee. Rexford lived in Napoleon, Michigan.

References

Year of birth missing
Year of death missing
Michigan state senators
People from Jackson County, Michigan
19th-century American politicians